Dhobi Doctor is a 1954 Bollywood film starring Kishore Kumar, Usha Kiran in lead roles.

Plot
Young and smart Ramu (Jagdeep) lives with his father, who is an washerman (Dhobi) and sister Laxmi. Once Laxmi becomes ill & dies only for the reason that there is no any doctor. Then, Ramu decides that he will be a doctor. Now after years, Ramu (Kishore Kumar) becomes a doctor & falls in love with Uma (Usha Kiran).

Cast
Kishore Kumar as Ramu
Usha Kiran as Uma

Songs

References

External links
 

1954 films
Films scored by Khayyam
1950s Hindi-language films
Indian drama films
1954 drama films
Indian black-and-white films